The Taiwan Top50 Tracker Fund or TTT  is an exchange-traded fund holding Taiwan stocks. The fund tracks the FTSE TWSE Taiwan 50 Index.

Top 10 holdings
Taiwan Semiconductor Manufacturing Company 
Hon Hai Precision Industry	
MediaTek	
Formosa Plastics	
Nan Ya Plastics (Formosa Plastics Group)
Chunghwa Telecom	
Formosa Chemicals & Fibre (Formosa Plastics Group)
Cathay Financial Holding
Delta Electronics		
China Steel		
	
(as of Jan. 2014)

External links
Yahoo! Finance page for 0050.TW
Yahoo! Finance page for 006208.TW
Bloomberg page for 0050:TT
Bloomberg page for 006208:TT

References

Finance in Taiwan
Taiwanese stock market indices
Companies listed on the Taiwan Stock Exchange
Companies listed on the Hong Kong Stock Exchange
Exchange-traded funds
Financial services companies established in 2003